J'Wan Andone Roberts is an American college basketball player for the Houston Cougars of the American Athletic Conference (AAC).

Early life and high school career 
Roberts was born and raised in Saint Thomas, U.S. Virgin Islands. After completing the 8th grade, he moved to the United States to live with his aunt in Killeen, Texas, in order to pursue a basketball career and increase his exposure to scouts. Houston coach Kelvin Sampson first noticed Roberts in 2017 while scouting another player at an exhibition game in Las Vegas. Sampson began tracking Roberts' career and following a strong junior season at Shoemaker High School, offered him a scholarship. Following an official visit, Roberts committed to the University of Houston on September 2, 2018.

College career 
Roberts redshirted during the 2019–20 season. In 2020–21, he began to receive playing time while Fabian White Jr. was injured. Following White's return from injury, Roberts received less playing time as the Cougars made a run to the Final Four. Roberts emerged as a key player off the bench for the Cougars in 2021–22, establishing himself as one of the team's top rebounders. In 2022–23, Roberts' play continued to improve, and he was named a starter. Along with becoming a leader in the locker room, he helped Houston achieve their first AP Poll #1 ranking since 1983, garnering praise from former Cougar Hakeem Olajuwon.

Career statistics

College

|-
| style="text-align:left;"| 2019–20
| style="text-align:left;"| Houston
| style="text-align:center;" colspan="11"|  Redshirt
|-
| style="text-align:left;"| 2020–21
| style="text-align:left;"| Houston
| 25 || 1 || 10.8 || .559 || – || .526 || 3.8 || .3 || .4 || .6 || 1.9
|-
| style="text-align:left;"| 2021–22
| style="text-align:left;"| Houston
| 38 || 0 || 16.2 || .628 || .000 || .500 || 4.9 || .5 || .6 || .4 || 3.2
|- class="sortbottom"
| style="text-align:center;" colspan="2"| Career
| 63 || 1 || 14.0 || .607 || .000 || .508 || 4.5 || .4 || .5 || .4 || 2.6

References

External links 
Houston Cougars bio 

2001 births
Living people
American men's basketball players
Forwards (basketball)
United States Virgin Islands men's basketball players
People from Saint Thomas, U.S. Virgin Islands
Houston Cougars men's basketball players

Year of birth missing (living people)